The 2022–23 season is the 53rd season in the existence of Toulouse FC and the club's first season back in the top flight of French football. In addition to the domestic league, Toulouse are participating in this season's edition of the Coupe de France. The season covers the period from 1 July 2022 to 30 June 2023.

Players

First-team squad

Out on loan

Transfers

In

Out

Pre-season and friendlies

Competitions

Overall record

Ligue 1

League table

Results summary

Results by round

Matches 
The league fixtures were announced on 17 June 2022.

Coupe de France

References

 

Toulouse FC seasons
Toulouse